Haydar Yavuz (born 5 September 1994) is a Turkish freestyle wrestler. In 2020, he won one of the bronze medals in the 70 kg event at the 2020 European Wrestling Championships held in Rome, Italy.

Career 

In 2018, he competed in the 70 kg event at the 2018 European Wrestling Championships held in Kaspiysk, Russia without winning a medal. In 2019, he competed in the 70 kg event at the 2019 World Wrestling Championships held in Nur-Sultan, Kazakhstan where he was eliminated in his first match by Aghahuseyn Mustafayev.

In 2020, he won the silver medal in the 70 kg event at the 2020 Individual Wrestling World Cup held in Belgrade, Serbia.

Achievements

References

External links 
 

Living people
1994 births
Place of birth missing (living people)
Turkish male sport wrestlers
European Wrestling Championships medalists
21st-century Turkish people